The 2003–04 Iowa State Cyclones men's basketball team represents Iowa State University during the 2003–04 NCAA Division I men's basketball season. The Cyclones were coached by Wayne Morgan, who was in his 1st season. They played their home games at Hilton Coliseum in Ames, Iowa, and competed in the Big 12 Conference.

Previous season

The Cyclones finished 17–14, 5–11 in Big 12 play to finish 9th the regular season conference standings.  They lost to Kansas in the quarterfinals of the Big 12 tournament.  They received an at-large bid to the NIT tournament where they defeated Wichita State and lost to Iowa.

On April 28, 2003, The Des Moines Register published pictures of head coach Larry Eustachy kissing several young women and holding a beer at a party near the University of Missouri's campus just hours after the Tigers defeated the Cyclones on January 22. The Register also reported that Eustachy had been seen at a fraternity party at Kansas State hours after his team lost to the Wildcats. During the scandal, the Register reported that Iowa State documents showed that the NCAA cited Eustachy for rules violations related to paying players.

On April 30, 2003, athletic director Bruce Van De Velde suspended Eustachy with pay and recommended that he be fired for violating a morals clause in his contract. Eustachy held a press conference in which he apologized for his behavior and admitted he had recently begun rehab treatment for alcoholism. Eustachy initially indicated he would contest the suspension. Instead, on May 5, he announced his resignation.

In the wake of the scandal assistant coach Wayne Morgan was promoted to replace Eustachy as head coach.

Incoming players

Roster

Schedule and results

|-
!colspan=12 style=""|Exhibition

|-

|-
!colspan=12 style=""|Regular Season

|-

|-

|-

|-

|-

|-

|-

|-

|-

|-

|-

|-
|-
|-

|-

|-

|-

|-

|-

|-

|-

|-

|-

|-

|-

|-

|-
!colspan=12 style=""|Big 12 Tournament
|-

|-

|-
!colspan=12 style=""|NIT Tournament
|-

|-

|-

|-

|-

Awards and honors

All-Conference Selections

Jackson Vroman (3rd Team)
Jake Sullivan (Honorable Mention)
Curtis Stinson (Honorable Mention)

Conference Freshman of the Year

Curtis Stinson (2004)

Academic All-Big 12 First Team

Jake Sullivan (2004)
Justin Fries (2004)

Freshman All-American

Curtis Stinson (2004)

Ralph A. Olsen Award

Curtis Stinson (2004)
Jackson Vroman (2004)
Jake Sullivan (2004)

References

Iowa State Cyclones men's basketball seasons
Iowa State
Hawaii
Iowa State Cyc
Iowa State Cyc